William Rohan may refer to:
 William M. Rohan, member of the Wisconsin State Assembly
 William "Skippy" Rohan, St. Louis gangster